Rejang Lebong is a regency of Bengkulu Province, Indonesia, on the island of Sumatra. It covers 1,475.99 km² and had a population of 246,787 at the 2010 Census and 276,645 at the 2020 Census; the official estimate as at mid 2021 was 278,793. The administrative centre of the Rejang Lebong Regency is the town of Curup. The Rejangese people are the most numerous ethnic group in Bengkulu Province, and inhabit the western half of the Regency, while the Lembak people inhabit the eastern half.

Administrative districts 

The Regency is divided into fifteen districts, tabulated below with their areas and populations at the 2010 Census and the 2020 Census, together with the official estimates as at mid 2021. The table also includes the locations of the district administrative centres, the number of villages (rural desa and urban kelurahan) in each district, and its post codes.

The Curup urban area, together with the three districts to its north (Bermani Ulu, Bermani Ulu Raya and Selupu Rejang) comprise the western part of the regency, covering 598.64 km2 with a population of 193,045 in mid 2021. The remaining seven districts comprise the larger but less densely populated eastern part of the regency, covering 951.64 km2 with a population of 85,748 in mid 2021.

References

This article is based in part on material from the Indonesian Wikipedia.

Regencies of Bengkulu